Fiendens musik ("The music of the enemy") was a rock band founded in Lund in 1977 by Mats Zetterberg and Mats Bäcker.

They began as a coverband and rapidly progressed when they began writing their own material, inspired by early punk, pubrock and New Wave. Their first single, "En spark rätt i skallen" (Jönsson/Schiffman) was released on Bellatrix in Malmö and was their breakthrough. Fiendens Musik was an amalgamation between Swedish progg and the new punk. Their stage performances was noted for their high temp, fast songs, clattering guitars, bellowing sax and a frantic stage show with musicians who literally fell over each other. Fiendens musik played together with bands like Ebba Grön, Dag Vag, Grisen Skriker, TT Reuter and others in the punk movement that they did not belong to, but sympathized with.

The band did under a short time four singles and two albums, all produced by Dan Tillberg on Bellatrix.

The band's composition varied slightly, but the main members were Mats Zetterberg, vocals, Harry Schiffman, guitar, Mats Bäcker, saxophone, Peter Kempinsky, guitar, Ulf Karlberg, bass, Ingvar "Krupa" Nilsson, drums, and Karl G. Jönsson, texts and design. The songs where usually written by Jönsson / Schiffman or Zetterberg / Schiffman. The band's name intended to criticize the publication Folket har aldrig segrat till fiendens musik ("The people has never been victorious to the music of the enemy") which was issued by the Maoist Oktoberförlaget the same year that the band was formed.

Discography
En spark rätt i skallen/Du går aldrig säker för Fiendens Musik (single) 1978
Pappa har alltid haft rätt (single) 1979
Moderata brudar (single) 1979
Musik mot gryningen (single) 1980
Fiendens Musik (LP) 1979
Häftiga hästen (LP) 1980
Fiendens Musik (reprint on cd 2004)

External links
 Fiendens musik - Website
Fiendens musik in Discogs
Fiendens musik on Spotify

Swedish rock music groups